A rocketeer is a person who uses rockets.

It may also refer to:

People
 A soldier specialized in rocket artillery
 1st Rocketeer Corps of Poland, who operated the Congreve rocket
 A person who rides rockets, an astronaut
 A person who operates model rockets
 A person specializing in creating rockets; a rocket scientist

Entertainment
 Rocketeer, a fictional comic book character and media franchise
 The Rocketeer (comic book), a comic book featuring the character
 The Rocketeer (film), a 1991 Disney film featuring the character
 The Rocketeer (NES video game), a 1991 videogame based on the film
 The Rocketeer (2019 TV series), a computer animated Disney show based on the character
 Rocketeers (comics), a Marvel Comics supervillain team
 "Rocketeer" (song), a 2010 song by Far East Movement off the album Free Wired

See also

 Rocketer, a sailing brig wrecked in 1857; see List of shipwrecks in January 1857
 Rosie the Rocketer, a scout attack plane
 Rosie the Rocketeer, a Boeing spaceflight test dummy 
 
 
 Rocket (disambiguation)
 Rocket Man (disambiguation)
 Missileer (disambiguation)